Claudio Canaparo is currently a visiting professor at Universidad de Quilmes, in Argentina. He has written as a literary critic, epistemologist, sociology of culture analyst and philosopher.

Education and career
Canaparo was born in the city port of Campana, Buenos Aires, Argentina, to a mother of Hebrew origins and an Italian rooted father; he was a traveller, manual worker and scientific researcher before entering academia. He studied at the Faculty of Political Science at the University of Rosario, at the Facultad Latinoamericana de Ciencias Sociales (FLACSO) in Buenos Aires, at the DAMS (delle arti, della musica e dello spettacolo) at the Università degli Studi di Bologna, and received his Ph.D. under the supervision of William Rowe at King's College London in 2000.

Prevented from working in Europe as a philosopher or social scientist, he developed most of his projects in academia as a ‘Latin American specialist’. He joined the Faculty of Arts at Exeter University in 1995 where he created the Centre for Latin American Studies. In 2009 he was appointed Visiting Professor at Birkbeck College, where he stays until 2015. He was also Associated Researcher at the Université Catholique de Louvain-la-Neuve in Belgium between 2007 and 2012. Between 2015 and 2021 he was professor or philosophy at the Académie de Bordeaux in France.

In 2012 he started to supervise and teach within the postgraduate program from the Universidad Nacional de Quilmes and from Universidad Nacional de Buenos Aires, both in Argentina. In the same year he developed a project of teaching basic philosophy to 8–10 years old children from ‘Arc-en-Ciel’ public school of Feugarolles in France. In 2014 he started to work within a multinational team of researchers and ONGs in a multidisciplinary project about climate change in relation with colonialism and geo-epistemology. From 2015 to 2021 he taught philosophy at the Lycée Stendhal (Aiguillon), at the Lycée George Sand (Nérac), and at Lycée Jean-Baptiste de Baudre (Agen), all in France.

Themes and related subjects

A. The principal effort of his work goes to establish the relation between knowledge and conceptual evolution, mainly focused on theories and related concepts about space with peripheral areas of the planet or, more precisely, having the peripheral spaces of the planet as its main intellectual frame. Themes of his works also include sociology of knowledge (Muerte y transfiguración de la cultura rioplatense, 2005), epistemology and colonialism, authorship theory (The Manufacture of an Author, 2000; El mundo Ingaramo, 2015), and science and writing.

Ciencia y escritura (2003)
The book discusses how the activity of writing determines the notion of knowledge which supports the ‘ideology’ of scientificity. Further more, the book explores how, when and why, the laboratory becomes the center of legitimization of modern science. To illustrate the argument, specific as well as generic leading cases, were explored. An article discussing the so-called ‘two-slit experiment’ is the first leading case, and an exhaustive analysis of the journal Nature constitutes the second leading case.

Geo-epistemology (2009)
The idea that we cannot establish a critical way of thinking, at least within peripheral areas of the planet, without having a standing in biosphere terms is the main hypothesis of this book. This work attempts to show how to proceed under these premises.

La emancipación intelectual (2010-2011) (unpublished)
A tetralogy about Latin America, which concentrates in the conceptual consequences colonialism, particularly looking at language, knowledge and what the author calls post-territoriality. This tetralogy also develops the idea of a second degree of colonialism, which refers to a number of objects, domains and concepts -highly productive in terms of knowledge and understanding- where colonialism is not usually analyzed. The first volume of this tretalogy, entitled ‘Viaje en Egipto. La formulación espacial del colonialismo y sus consecuencias’ [Travel within Egypt. The spatial formulation of colonialism and its consequences], analyses contemporary colonialism within peripheral places from the point of view of the relationship between knowledge and diaspora. The second volume, entitled ‘El pensamiento del ojo en las colonias. La formulación espacial del colonialismo y sus visiones’ [The eye’s thought. The spatial formulation of colonialism and its visions], focus on visual perception and visual developments as a way of dominant cogito in peripheral areas. The third volume, entitled ‘El autor periférico. La formulación espacial del colonialismo y sus identidades’ [The peripheral author. The spatial formulation of colonialism and its identities], focus on the constitution of a parallel phenomenon: the constitution of the notion of self and the constitution of a narrative entity usually called authorship. Finally, the fourth volume, entitled ‘La negociación del espacio y los sentimientos bajo el colonialism’ [The negotiation of space and feelings under the colonialism], focus on the way the constitution of a sentimental life within individuals in peripheral areas of the planet is dominated by technological set-ups referred to a number of activities, from writing to learning, and from eating to building houses.

El imaginario Patagonia (2011)
How the relation between biosphere spaces and conceptual evolution works, within peripheral areas of the planet, is the main topic of this book. To explore the argument an exhaustive and length argumentation concerning Patagonia has been established as the leading case.

B. The notion of ‘pensamiento periférico’ emerges then as a way to develop the hypothesis of ‘reversal thinking’ and proposed as a first approximation to the geo-epistemology approach,. Developed as a project in a four-volumes series between 2015 and 2018 it has one volume dedicated to the relation of peripheral ‘pensamiento’ with the European philosophy and its history; a second volume which attempts to establish a general conceptual framework, a third volume revisiting the notion of anthropology and nature, and a final volume which explores a leading case focusing on the idea of ‘disposal, trash, rubbish, dust’ (basura, residuo) as an epistemic and anthropological problem.

La cuestión periférica (2021)
How, when and under which format the ways of thinking in peripheral areas of the planet have been colonized, not only by European philosophy, but mainly by the way in which such philosophy has been studied, developed and historiographisized, even locally: such questions are conceptually addressed in this book and constitute its main purpose.

El mundo de atrás (2019)
The book develops the main conceptual frame under which the ‘pensamiento’ -as a way to combine a thought about ‘things’ (bodies, apparatuses, objects, mechanisms), technology and a biosphere dimension- can be established in peripheral areas of the planet.

El fin de la naturaleza (2023)
What is the relation between the anthropological concept of human, within peripheral areas of the planet, and a notion of nature is the main question of this book. The increasing relevance of the non-human in the definition of human is one of the phenomena explored within the arguments, as well as the radical change of the idea of ‘viviente’ (living thing).

El pensamiento basura (2017)
How the ‘basura’ (trash, disposals, rubbish) becomes a central component of our daily life is as important as its consequences in material and non-material terms. From this starting point the book explores what and in which way the ‘basura’ determines our way of thinking, our individuality, as well as our material existence in peripheral areas of the planet.

C. Currently he is working in relation with the radical changes that the Anthropocene conditions of the biosphere has in terms of speculation and thinking, always in peripheral areas of the planet. More specifically, he is trying to explore the growing entanglement between thinking and anthropology.

Select Bibliography

(i) Books

(2021) La cuestión periférica. Heidegger, Derrida, Europa,
(2019) El mundo de atrás. Efecto antropoceno y especulación en los ámbitos periféricos,
(2017) El pensamiento basura. Transitoriedad, materia, viaje y mundo periférico,
(2015) El mundo Ingaramo,
(2011) El imaginario Patagonia. Ensayo acerca de la evolución conceptual del espacio,
(2009) Geo-Epistemology. Latin America and the Location of Knowledge,
(2007) El enigma de lo real (ed. with Geneviève Fabry)
(2005) Muerte y transfiguración de la cultura rioplatense,
(2004) Ciencia y escritura,
(2001) El perlonghear. Postulados de un pensamiento posracionalista,
(2000) Imaginación, mapas, escritura. Noción de espacio y perspectiva cognitiva,
(2000) The Manufacture of an Author. Reinaldo Arenas’s literary world, his readers and other contemporaries,
(2000) Jorge Luis Borges. Intervenciones sobre pensamiento y literatura
(1998) El artificio como cuestión. Conjeturas en torno a Respiración artificial,

(ii) Articles/ chapters in books

 (with Sergio Pedernera) ‘Sangre, espacio y cartografía’, en Mataderos. Pampa y asfalto, Buenos Aires: Dirección General patrimonio, museos y casco histórico, 2022, pp. 17-35.
 ‘Diéresis y acontecer en The Imaginary Agent (1985) de Edmundo Benaján’, en Claudia Hammerschmidt, ed. Patagonia literaria II. Funciones, proyecciones e intervenciones de autoría estratégica en la nueva literatura patagónica, Potsdam: INOLAS, 2016, pp. 445–459.
 ‘La especulación cartográfica’, in Sergio Pedernera, ed.,  Ars Cartographica. Cartografía histórica de Buenos Aires 1830–1889, Buenos Aires: Dirección General Patrimonio e Instituto Histórico, 2015, pp. 17–20.
 ‘Film and Migration in Latin America’, in Immanuel Ness, ed. Encyclopaedia of Global Human Migration, London: Wiley Blackwell, 2013. 
 ‘El pensamiento del ojo’, in Israel Sanmartín Barros/Patricia Calvo González/Eduardo Rey Tristán, eds.,  en América Latina y Europa, Santiago: Universidad de Santiago de Compostela, 2012, pp. 125–141.
 (with André-Jean Arnaud, Érika Patino Cardoso, Marco Aurélio Serau Junior, Ricardo Rollo Duarte) ‘Frontières’, in André-Jean Arnaud (ed.), Dictionnaire de la globalisation, Paris: L. G. D. J., 2010, pp. 226–228. (25 cm x 17 cm)
 (with Guilherme Figueiredo Leite Gonçalves, Márcio Alves Fonseca) ‘Gouvernabilité’, in André-Jean Arnaud (ed.), Dictionnaire de la globalisation, Paris: L. G. D. J., 2010, pp. 263–265. (25 cm x 17 cm)
 (with Guilherme Figueiredo Leite Gonçalves, Márcio Alves Fonseca, Orlando Villas Bôas Filho) ‘Pouvoir’, in André-Jean Arnaud (ed.), Dictionnaire de la globalisation, Paris: L. G. D. J., 2010, pp. 415–419. (25 cm x 17 cm)
 ‘Geo-Epistemología’ in Hugo E. Biagini/Arturo Roig (dirs.), Diccionario de pensamiento alternativo II, available at www.cecies.org. Project of ‘Pensamiento Latinoamericano Alternativo’, based at the University of Lanús, Argentina.
 ‘Science and Empire. The Geo-epistemic Location of Knowledge’ in P. Lorenzano, H-J Rheinberger, E. Ortiz and C. Galles, eds., History and Philosophy of Science and Technology, Oxford: UNESCO/EOLSS Publishers, 2008. Available at www.eolss.net.
 ‘La consumación del realismo’ in G. Fabry/C. Canaparo (eds.), El enigma de lo real, Bern: Peter Lang, 2007 pp. 199–275. (22.4 cm x 14.8 cm).
 ‘The <Nature effect> in Latin American Science Publications’ in E. Ortiz/E. Fishburn (eds.): Science and the Creative Imagination in Latin America, London: Institute for the Study of the Americas, 2005, pp. 97–118. (23.0 cm x 15.3 cm).
 ‘Marconi and other Artifices: Long-range Technology and the Conquest of the Desert’ in J. Andermann/W. Rowe (eds.), Images of Power. Iconography Culture and the State in Latin America, Toronto: Books, 2005, pp. 241–254. (23.5 cm x 15.7 cm).
‘Medir, trazar, ver. Arte cartográfico y pensamiento en Jorge Eduardo Eielson’ in José Ignacio Padilla (ed.), Nu/do. Homenaje a J. E. Eielson, Lima: Pontificia Universidad Católica del Perú, 2002, pp. 289–314. (24.0 cm x 24.0 cm).
 ‘’ in W. Rowe et al. (editors): Jorge Luis Borges. Intervenciones sobre pensamiento y literatura, Barcelona/Buenos Aires: Paidós, 2000, pp. 199–247. (23.9 cm x 15.5 cm).
 Encyclopedia of Latin American Literature, London: Fitzroy Dearborn Publishers, 1997, 926 pp. (28.6 cm x 21.8 cm, ISBN I-884964-18-4). Articles on: (1)‘GELMAN, Juan  (1930-  ) ’; (2)‘Juan Gelman: el juego en que andamos’; (3)‘Cambaceres, Eugenio (1843-1888)’; (4)‘ORTIZ, Juan Laurentino (1896-1978)’; (5)‘SORIANO, Osvaldo (1943- ) ’; (6)‘El juguete rabioso en las Aguafuertes porteñas’; (7)‘El astillero’; (8)‘Ibarguengoitia, Jorge (1928-1983)’; (9)‘Yañez, Agustín (1904-1980)’.

(iii) Articles in journals

 ‘A dónde ir, qué hacer. Periferia y latourismo’, in Revista Orillera, Universidad Nacional de Avellaneda, Buenos Aires, año 3, num. 4, primavera 2018, pp. 63–68.
 ‘Historia especulativa del presente’, in Historiografías, número 15, Enero-Junio, 2018, pp. 16–21. Doi 10.26754/ojs_historiografias/21744289
 ‘Más allá del fin del mundo: Seguridad, violencia, territorio’, in Vegueta. Anuario de la Facultad de Geografía e Historia, número 17, 2017, pp. 279–298.
 ‘La idea de revolución en la periferia’, en SÉMATA, Ciencias Sociais e Humanidades, 2016, vol. 28: 29–55.
 ‘Was ist Aufklärung? o la teoría del iLuminismo’ in Pensamiento de los Confines, University of Buenos Aires, número 29, mayo 2013, pp. 171–176. 
 ‘El Antropoceno argentino’, in Revista Orillera, Universidad Nacional de Avellaneda, Buenos Aires, año 1, num. 1, invierno 2016, pp. 67–71.
 ‘Migration and radical constructivist epistemology’, in Crossings: Journal of Migration and Culture, volume 3, number 2, pp. 181–200, 2012.
 ‘Para una fisiología de las condiciones del especular. Posthumanismo, pensamiento e historiografía europea en la periferia’, in Pensamiento de los Confines, University of Buenos Aires, número 27, marzo 2011, pp. 136–156 (28.8 cm x 15.0 cm).
 (Co-authored with Luis Rebaza-Soraluz and William Rowe) ‘Introduccción’, in Latin American Studies in the UK, Bulletin of Spanish Studies (Glasgow), volume LXXXIV, Numbers 4–5, pp. 441–445 (17.4 cm x 24.8 cm, ISSN 1475-3820).
 ‘Ciencia y tecnología en El Eternauta’ in Revista Iberoamericana, University of Pittsburgh, volumen 73, number 221, Oct-Dec 2007, 871-886 (15.2 cm x 23.0 cm, ISSN 0034-9631).
 ‘Arte y desencanto en Elias Ingaramo’ in Bulletin of Hispanic Studies, Liverpool, volume 84, number 3, pp. 335–346, 2007 (17.4 cm x 24.8 cm, ISSN 1475-3820).
 ‘La finalidad literaria’ in Pensamiento de los Confines, University of Buenos Aires/Fondo de Cultura Económica, número 19, diciembre 2006, pp. 112–118 (28.8 cm x 15.0 cm).
 ‘De poiesis sive poetica. Notas para una fisiología del lenguaje’ in Aleph. Revista de literatura hispanoamericana, Université de Liège/Catholique de Louvain, número 20, enero de 2006, pp. 81–104 (20.5 cm x 14.3 cm).
 ‘Un mundo modernista para la cultura rioplatense’ in Bulletin of Spanish Studies  (Glasgow), volume LXXIX, numbers 2–3, March–May 2002, pp. 193–209 (17.4 cm x 24.8 cm, ISSN 1475-3820).
 ‘El mapa borgeano y sus alrededores’ in INTI. Revista Literaria Hispánica, Providence, Brown University, number 48, 1998, pp. 3–18 (22.8 cm x 15.1 cm, ISSN 0732-6750).
 ‘Juan José Saer interviewed’ in Travesia. Journal of Latin American Cultural Studies, [London], volume 4, number 1, June 1995 (24.9 cm x 17.6 cm, ISSN 0965-8343).

References
 Ciencia y escritura.
 The Manufacture of an Author.
 La consumación del realismo.
 El imaginario Patagonia. 

External links
Birkbeck College faculty page
Université catholique de Louvain faculty page
Personal page

Epistemologists
Continental philosophers
21st-century Argentine philosophers
1952 births
Living people
Alumni of King's College London